William Reid may refer to:

Politicians
William Allan Reid (1865–1952), British Conservative Party Member of Parliament for Derby 1931–1945
William Earl Reid (1934–2013), politician in British Columbia, Canada
William Ferguson Reid (born 1925), Virginia physician, politician and civil rights activist
William Henry Reid (1846–1912), Ontario farmer and political figure
William Reid (British politician) (1889–1965), United Kingdom Member of Parliament for Glasgow Provan 1955–1964
William Reid (New York politician) (1827–1906), American manufacturer and politician from New York
Willie Mae Reid, African-American politician, Socialist Workers Party candidate for mayor of Chicago, 1975

Sportspeople

American football
Bill Reid (American football coach) (1878–1976), American football player and coach
Bill Reid (center) (born 1952), American football player
Willie Reid (American football) (born 1982), American football player

Association football
Willie Reid (football manager) (died 1975), manager of Norwich City F.C. (1961–1962)
Willie Reid (footballer, born 1884) (1884–1964), Scottish international footballer and manager, who played as a striker for Rangers, Motherwell and Albion Rovers
Willie Reid (footballer, born 1903) (1903–1967), Irish footballer for Glentoran, Bethlehem Steel, Heart of Midlothian

Other sports
William Reid (basketball) (1893–1955), basketball coach and administrator
William Reid (rugby league), rugby league footballer of the 1910s for England, and Widnes
William Reid (South Australia cricketer) (1867–1943), Australian cricketer
William Reid (Tasmania cricketer) (1882–1950), Tasmania cricketer

Others
William Reid (British Army officer) (1791–1858), British soldier and Governor of the Bermudas, Windward Islands, and Malta
William Reid (civil servant) (born 1931), former Parliamentary and Health Service Ombudsman
William Reid (mining engineer) (1906–1985), Scottish coal expert and co-author of the "Reid Report" on the state of British coal-mining
William Reid (musician) (born 1958), guitarist with The Jesus and Mary Chain
William Reid (Scottish businessman) (1842–?), early financier of railroads in Oregon's Willamette Valley
William Reid (VC) (1921–2001), Scottish World War II war hero
William Arbuckle Reid (1933–2015), British educator, curriculum theorist, and philosophical disciple of Joseph Schwab
William Hamilton Reid (died 1826), British poet and hack writer
William P. Reid (1854–1932), Scottish locomotive engineer
William Reid (military historian) (1926–2014), Scottish military historian
William Reid (psychiatrist), American forensic psychiatrist
William S. Reid (1778–1853), vice president and acting president of Hampden–Sydney College
William Reid IV, American lawyer
Bill Reid (1920–1998), artist
Gordon Reid (priest) (William Gordon Reid, born 1942), Anglican priest, former Dean of Gibraltar and Vicar General of the Diocese of Europe

Characters
William Reid, a character in Criminal Minds, father of Dr. Spencer Reid

See also
William Reed (disambiguation)
William Reade (disambiguation)
William Rede (disambiguation)
William Read (disambiguation)
Billy Reid (disambiguation)